After being expelled from Ukrainian Premier League Karpaty were admitted to Ukrainian Second League for the 2020–21 season. It was their 1st season on the 3rd tier of Ukrainian football.

Players

Squad information

Transfers

In

Out

Pre-season and friendlies

Competitions

Overall

Second League. Group A

League table

Results summary

Results by round

Matches

 Match held without spectators due to dire epidemic situation.
 Matches cancelled because FC Kalush decided to withdraw.

Ukrainian Cup

Statistics

Appearances and goals

|-
! colspan=16 style=background:#dcdcdc; text-align:center| Goalkeepers

|-
! colspan=16 style=background:#dcdcdc; text-align:center| Defenders

|-
! colspan=16 style=background:#dcdcdc; text-align:center| Midfielders

|-
! colspan=16 style=background:#dcdcdc; text-align:center| Forwards

|-
! colspan=16 style=background:#dcdcdc; text-align:center| Players transferred out during the season

Last updated: 11 June 2021

Goalscorers

Last updated: 11 June 2021

Clean sheets

Last updated: 20 April 2021

Disciplinary record

Last updated: 11 June 2021

References

External links
 Official website

Karpaty Lviv
FC Karpaty Lviv seasons